SM UC-29 was a German Type UC II minelaying submarine or U-boat in the German Imperial Navy during World War I. The U-boat was ordered on 29 August 1915 and was launched on 15 July 1916. She was commissioned into the German Imperial Navy on 15 August 1916 as SM UC-29. In an eight-month career, the UC-29 performed seven combat patrols into the Atlantic Ocean during the German war on Allied trade (Handelskrieg). In these patrols she was very successful, sinking 18 allied ships, totalling 21,909 GRT. She also damaged 4 ships of 17,154 GRT. Pargust was commanded by British submarine hunter Gordon Campbell and had on board Ronald Niel Stuart and William Williams, who were awarded the Victoria Cross for their actions in the engagement.

Her wreck lies in Cork Harbour, Ireland.

Design
A German Type UC II submarine, UC-29 had a displacement of  when at the surface and  while submerged. The submarine was powered by two six-cylinder four-stroke diesel engines each producing  (a total of ), two electric motors producing , and two propeller shafts.

UC-29 was fitted with six  mine tubes, eighteen UC 200 mines, three  torpedo tubes (one on the stern and two on the bow), seven torpedoes, and one  Uk L/30 deck gun. Her complement was twenty-six crew members.

Summary of raiding history

References

Notes

Citations

Bibliography

 
 

Ships built in Hamburg
German Type UC II submarines
U-boats commissioned in 1916
Maritime incidents in 1917
U-boats sunk in 1917
U-boats sunk by British warships
World War I minelayers of Germany
World War I shipwrecks in the Atlantic Ocean
World War I submarines of Germany
1916 ships